Christ's Church, Changzhou is a Protestant church located in Zhonglou District, Changzhou, Jiangsu, China.

History 
In 1903, the Methodist Episcopal Church, South established the Christ's Church in Changzhou, Jiangsu. The church traces its origins to the former Kaile Church, founded by the American missionary John Hawk in 1916 in memory of his sister-in-law Carriger Hawk.

The church was renamed Christ's Church in 1958. This name has been used to date. The church was closed during the ten-year Cultural Revolution. Renovations and a rebuilding of the main building began in July 2002 and were completed in March 2004 in a Gothic architectural style. The church was officially reopened to the public on 11 December 1983.

Gallery

References

Further reading 
 

Churches in Changzhou
Tourist attractions in Changzhou
2004 establishments in China
Protestant churches in China
Churches completed in 2004